Hermilio Valdizán (November 20, 1885 – December 25, 1929) was a Peruvian physician who specialized in psychiatry.

Works written
Crime in Peru (1909), a well-documented essay which studies the various factors of crime in social groups in Peru, mainly in the Indian race.
Sexual perversions in the early Peruvians (1911)
Medical problems of marriage (1912)
Psychiatry in Peru (1912)
A Psichiatra of secolo XVI (1913)
The art of the barber (1913)
Martin de Porres surgeon (1913)
From the past... (1914)
Locos of the colony (1919)
Peruvian folk medicine (1922, in three volumes, in collaboration with Angel Maldonado).
Sick Story (1923), narrative work.
A collection of the works of Dr. Jose Casimiro Ulloa, in two volumes (1924-1925).
Peruvian Medical Dictionary in six volumes, the first volume being published in 1923. The second volume appeared in 1938, and the rest of the work was published in installments in the Annals of the Faculty of Medicine since 1957. It is a work that brings abundant biographical information, literature, etymology, and medical folk.
Italian Doctors in Peru (1924)
History of the Faculty of Medicine of Lima 1811-1911 (1925, in three volumes).
children Nelida Bardinet (1924)
Dr. Hipólito Unanue (1926).
Notes for Peruvian medical literature (1928)
Reforming medical studies (1928)
Medical Chronicles (1929)
You, you're father (1934)
History of Peruvian medicine (posthumous, 1944).

References

1885 births
1929 deaths
Peruvian psychiatrists